Nikolay Georgiev Tsonev  (born 9 June 1956) Nikolay Georgiev Tsonev is a military officer in the Bulgarian Armed Forces, entrepreneur, politician, leader of the political party New Alternative (2012-2022) and former Minister of Defence in the period 2008-2009.
In fulfilment of his managerial positions, he is responsible for a number of strategic reforms in the Bulgarian Army, specifically these in the Security sector. 

During his tenure as minister, he amended the Defence and Armed Forces Act and provided armed forces personnel with numerous social incentives. Along with this, he undertook financial optimizations that allowed the budget of the Ministry of Defence to reach a size of nearly 2% of Bulgaria's gross domestic product.

Before becoming a Minister of Defence, Nikolay Tsonev worked as a manager of several companies engaged in the field of light industry. 
From 1999 to 2000, he headed the Supply Management Directorate at the Ministry of Defence. In 2001, he became a ministerial adviser to the Minister of Defence Nikolay Svinarov, and in 2002 he headed the Executive Agency “Social Activities at the Ministry of Defence”.

Biography 
Nikolay Tsonev was born on June 9, 1956 in the town of Pernik. He graduated from “Georgi Dimitrov” National Military Artillery School, majoring in Anti-Aircraft Artillery and since 1978 he has been an officer in the Bulgarian Armed Forces. In the years from 1986 through 1989, he studied at The Vasilevsky Military Academy in Kyiv. In 1992, he left the army. 

In the following years, Tsonev participated in the management of several companies. In 1996, he graduated with an accounting degree at the University of National and World Economy. In 2005, he graduated Sofia University "St. Kliment Ohridski", where he majored in Philosophy. In 2006, he defended his doctorate thesis in Marketing. Since 2002, he has been a lecturer at UNWE (University of National and World Economy). Since 2015, Nikolay Tsonev has been an associate professor of Economics and Management, and since 2019 he has been elected as Head of the "Economics of Tourism" department at UNWE.

From 1999 to 2000, he headed the Supply Management Directorate at the Ministry of Defence. In 2001, he became a ministerial adviser to the Minister of Defence Nikolay Svinarov, and in 2002 he headed the Executive Agency “Social Activities at the Ministry of Defence”. On April 24, 2008, he was appointed Minister of Defence in the government of Sergey Stanishev and remained on this position until the change of the cabinet on July 27, 2009.

On June 24, 2012, at the founding meeting of the political party "Nova Alternativa" he was elected chairman of the party. The party has a centrist orientation and professes patriotic-liberal ideas.

References

1956 births
Living people
People from Pernik
Bulgarian businesspeople
National Movement for Stability and Progress politicians
Members of the National Assembly (Bulgaria)
Bulgarian politicians convicted of crimes
Defence ministers of Bulgaria